Scott Morrow (born June 18, 1969) is an American former professional ice hockey player who played four games in the National Hockey League for the Calgary Flames in 1994–95.   Morrow was drafted by the Hartford Whalers in the 5th round, 95th overall, of the 1988 NHL Entry Draft.  He retired following the 2001–02 season.

Morrow played four years at the University of New Hampshire before turning pro, where he was named a Second Team All-Star by Hockey East in 1992.

Personal life
Morrow's nephew, Scott, plays college ice hockey for the UMass Minutemen.

Awards and honors

References

External links

1969 births
Living people
Augusta Lynx players
B.C. Icemen players
Calgary Flames players
Cincinnati Cyclones (IHL) players
Hartford Whalers draft picks
Hershey Bears players
Manitoba Moose (IHL) players
New Hampshire Wildcats men's ice hockey players
Ice hockey people from Chicago
Providence Bruins players
Saint John Flames players
Springfield Indians players
American men's ice hockey left wingers